Taraxacum platycarpum, also called the Korean dandelion, is a species of dandelion that grows in Korea. 
A member of the Cichorieae tribe of the Asteraceae, it also grows in other countries as a native plant, such as China and Japan.

Images

References

External links
 

platycarpum
Plants described in 1907
Flora of Korea